This could refer to either the:
2014 Sochi GP2 Series round
2014 Sochi GP3 Series round